Haim Frank Ilfman (born March 18, 1970) is an Israeli award-winning composer.

He studied trombone and piano at the Jaffa Conservatorium of Music in Tel Aviv and as a young teenager was playing lead trombone with the Tel Aviv Dixieland Band. He was eventually asked to leave the conservatorium for truancy.

In 1984, during a visit to Berlin, Ilfman was introduced to German composer Klaus Doldinger, at that time was scoring The NeverEnding Story. A visit to the film’s recording sessions had a powerful impact on Ilfman, who henceforth committed himself to composing for films. 

He has scored more than forty films and numerous television shows, as well as the fanfare for Legendary Entertainment.

Career 
Ifmans most known scores include the award-winning films Big Bad Wolves and Cupcakes, with scores performed by The London Metropolitan Orchestra at Air Studios.

He has also scored May I Kill U?, a dark comedy, directed by BAFTA award winner Stuart Urban and starring Kevin Bishop; Mercenaries, directed by Paris Leonti, starring Robert Fucilla and Billy Zane; the three-part documentaries The Iraq War and Putin, Russia and the West for BBC and the film Bitter Seeds, directed by Micha Peled.

Frank Ilfman's latest works includes Ghost Stories and 68 Kill; the Danish thriller Robin and the film adaptation of the book The Etruscan Smile; the film's score was recorded at Air Studios in London and was performed by the London Metropolitan Orchestra.

Forthcoming films include Apples and Oranges and the romantic comedy Emotional Rescue.

In 2008 Frank Ilfman was invited to join the European Film Academy and The British Academy of Film and Television Arts (BAFTA).

Films & documentaries 

Emotional Rescue
Big Bad Wolves
Locked In
May I kill U?
Cupcakes (AKA Bananot)
Coward
Incessant Visions
Bitter Seeds
Mercenaries
Rabies (Kalevet)
Fifth Street
The Ferryman
Nemesis Game
The Intruder

Television 

The Iraq war
Russia’s Open Book
Football Gladiators
Irena Sendler: In the Name of Their Mothers
Putin, Russia And The West
Different Life
The Wanders
Here / Shapiro

Awards and recognition 

 2014 Saturn Award: Won Best Movie Score- Big Bad Wolves
 2013 Sitges Film Festival: Jury Special Mention Best Music in a Movie 2013- Big Bad Wolves
 2013 The Israeli Film Academy Awards: Winner Best Original Score- Big Bad Wolves
 The New Zealand Film & TV Awards: Best Soundtrack- Nemesis Game
 Israeli Film Academy: nomination for Best Score- Noodle
 Golden Genie: Two times Nomination Best Original Score

Personal life 
Frank Ilfman spends his time between London, Los Angeles and Spain. After the plane in which Ilfman was traveling was hit by lighting during a flight between London and Tel Aviv, he developed a phobia for flying although he still enjoys sky diving. Frank Ilfman is fluent in English, Hebrew and German.

References

External links
 
 
 Ilfman at DNA Music
 Big Bad Wolves score at Screen Archives

1970 births
Living people
Israeli film score composers
Male film score composers
Musicians from Tel Aviv